Belarus (earlier ) is a series of four-wheeled tractors produced since 1950 at Minsk Tractor Works, MTZ in Minsk, Belarus.
These tractors are very well known throughout the Commonwealth of Independent States and are exported to more than 100 countries worldwide, including the United States and Canada.

History 

At the end of World War II, agricultural infrastructure in the Soviet Union was in a poor state, production of agricultural machinery having been nonexistent during the later years of the War. Those tractors and machinery still working on the large collective farms were worn from heavy use and also dated, with most having been produced in the early 1930s or earlier. At best, these tractors were unreliable and were poorly maintained. The communist state ordered new tractors to be made at several locations within the USSR. The main assembly plant for MTZ was in Minsk, with smaller tractors being produced in other locations and other factories producing high-horsepower articulated and tracked tractors. All these tractors were exported under the name "Belarus", but were of a different design to each other.

Within the Eastern Bloc the tractors had no paint scheme: they were simply painted the same colour all over, with red, green and blue being the most common. In the late 1980s Belarus tractors gained a paint livery of cream/white, cream wheels, with a red chassis; this remained until the late 1990s, when it changed to red with a black chassis and cream wheels (later silver).
A green alternative to the red was available for some markets during the 2000s (decade). Blue with a black chassis is currently the livery for the more basictwo-wheel-drive cab-less models.

Up to the 1950s MTZ had not produced wheeled tractors, tracked crawler tractors being more common. These early tractors were essentially re-claimed tanks, with the gun turret removed and a flatbed, winch, crane or dozer blade added; the tractors saw more use in land reclamation and forestry applications rather than agriculture.  This was largely due to the tanks being unsuitable for large-scale cultivation, as their engine, transmission and track reliability were poor due to not being designed for pulling loads for long periods, as required in agriculture. New designs were put into production during 1950, and the new MTZ wheeled tractor was born. These tractors were built to the three main concepts of Soviet engineering: reliability, simplicity and value for money.

During the Cold War, the Belarus tractors that were sold in western markets were infamous for their low quality compared to western manufacturers' tractors. The Soviets' incapacity to build tractors with quality materials became to symbolize the failure of Communism in the 1980s and after the fall of the Berlin Wall. Often the tractor factories could not obtain quality materials, and so the tractors of the late Soviet Union were made with inferior components. The quality of rubber seals, gaskets and paint was particularly poor in the early 1990s. The Belarus name suffered much during this time, but with a higher investment level in the 1990s–2000s the name had a significant "relaunching" and nowoffers a high-quality product that meets European and North American standards.

Some 3 million tractors have been built in the Minsk Tractor Works since 1948. In 2010, distribution of Belarus tractors in United States and Canada was re-established through a local distributor "MTZ Equipment Ltd".
One of the contributing factors was the fact that the factory started making tractors with compression ignition diesel engines matching the current emissions standards, including Tier 3/4i/4 (United States/Canada) and Euro 3a, 3b, 4 for emission standards in Europe.

In February 2014, the MTZ brand made its first appearance at the National Farm Machinery Show in Louisville, Kentucky, with the MTZ 1220 tractor model.

A Belarus model 1523.3 tractor was gifted to Vladimir Putin on his 70th birthday by President of Belarus Aleksander Lukashenko.

Mechanical description 
MTZ stand for Minskii Traktornyi Zavod. translated to English: Minsk Tractor Works

MTZ tractors were originally designed for the vast State owned collective farms of the USSR, situated in the most inhospitable areas of Eastern Europe these collectives extended over many thousands of hectares and had little in the way of workshop tools and spare parts. The tractors were built in such a way that even a novice could get the tractor working again with only basic instruction.

The air filter was of a washable oil bath type, the centrifugal Engine oil filter only required washing out rather than replacing, whilst the hydraulic and fuel filters were also of a washable design until the 1990s.
Until recently the tractors had either an air or liquid-cooled engine with a 4-cylinder diesel being the most common configuration, while larger 6-cylinder and articulated models were available.
A variety of methods were used to start the engines depending on the model.  A 24-volt electric starter motors was most common on export models and for use in less rural locations where replacement batteries were more easily obtainable. A diesel, kerosene or petrol 2-stroke starting engine was more common in the Eastern bloc countries due to them being more reliable in the colder winters and batteries being expensive or simply unobtainable. 
Various adaptations to the tractor have also been made to aid starting in cold weather, including a lever to disconnect the hydraulic pump.
The three-point hitch is operated by a hydraulic cylinder, and is one of the few tractor designs that can apply "Down Pressure" with the three-point hitch.

The design of the tractors has changed much since the 1990s. Since the fall of the Soviet Union in 1991 MTZ-Belarus tractors have become more complex and more advanced, mainly due to imported Western built tractors becoming serious competitors, so MTZ had to compete for the market and modify their designs accordingly. In the past MTZ had paid little attention to cosmetic appearance and operator comfort, but recently these have become more important, however for certain markets a basic tractor is still available. These models are much the same as the tractors of the 1970s and have little in the way of comfort and extras such as power steering. There still remains a market for this type of tractor and Belarus remains the first choice for buyers looking for a basic and simple machine.

Licensing

Azerbaijan 
In December 2004 Ganja Auto Plant restarted manufacturing and the first car built at the factory was sold. In 2008, the plant produced about 600 cars and tractors.

Pakistan 
Fecto Group first introduced Soviet Brand Tractors in West Pakistan back in 1962. Initially tractors were imported from USSR. Later Fecto Belarus Tractor Assembly Plant was built in Lahore in 1980's. Since then different Tractor Models were introduced ranging from from 25 H.P to 80 H.P. These include:
MTZ -50 (55 H.P) C.B.U
MTZ -50 (55 H.P) local locally assembled
T -25 A (25 H.P)s.
UMZ -60 (60 H.P/li>
Belarus-510 ( 57 H.P)
Belarus-520 (62 H.P)
Belarus -511 (57 H.P)
Belarus-800(80 H.P)

Romania 
In October 2010 the Romanian company IRUM in Reghin, specializing in articulated lumber tractors, started assembling from imported KD Belarus TAG tractors for the local market.

Serbia 
In 2011 the Serbian company Agropanonka started assembling 3,000 tractors per year for its local market.

Tajikistan 
In September 2012, Tajikistan and Belarus reached agreement to set up a company producing Belarus tractors in the south of Tajikistan. The new facility will produce 250 tractors per year. By 2017 the company’s capacity will be increased up to 1,500. There are plans to export some of tractors produced in Tajikistan to other countries of the region.

Cambodia 
In March 2013, a Belarus Tractor Assembly Plant opened near Phnom Penh in Cambodia. The joint project involves the annual supplying of more than 400 different models of tractors to the markets of Cambodia and surrounding countries.

References

External links

Massey ferguson parts
 MTZ Equipment Ltd. (Official distributor in the United States and Canada)
 Browns of Liversedge Belarus Tractors (UK distributor)
 Belarus in Australia and New Zealand
 Belarus / MTZ tractor specifications
A tractor rally in Belarusian Paris – Belarus photo digest

Belarusian brands
History of Minsk
Economy of Minsk
Tractors
Tractors of the Soviet Union